Wolfgang Hollegha (born 4 March 1929) is an Austrian painter.

Biography 

Hollegha was born in Klagenfurt, Kärnten/Carinthia. From 1947 to 1954 he studied at the Akademie der bildenden Künste in Vienna with Josef Dobrovský and Herbert Boeckl. In 1956, together with Josef Mikl, Markus Prachensky and Arnulf Rainer, he formed the "Malergruppe St. Stephan". In 1960 he was invited by Clement Greenberg to participate in New York in a group exhibition of abstract painters. In 1964 he participated in the third Documenta in Kassel. Since 1962 he lives and works in Rechberg Steiermark (Styria), where he has built for himself a 14 meter high studio tower. He became a professor at the Vienna Art Academy in 1972 and remained in this position until his retirement in 1997.

Work 

Wolfgang Hollegha is considered the leading abstract painter in Austria. His works can be found in many private collections as well as museums around the world (e.g. Albertina, Vienna; Museum Moderne Kunst Stiftung Ludwig, Vienna; Museum of Art, Portland, Oregon; Carnegie Museum of Art, Pittsburgh).

References

External links 
Essl collection, Vienna
Neue Galerie Graz (in German)
Essay by Andrea Schurian

1929 births
Living people
20th-century Austrian painters
21st-century Austrian painters
21st-century male artists
Austrian male painters
Academy of Fine Arts Vienna alumni
Artists from Klagenfurt
Academic staff of the Academy of Fine Arts Vienna
20th-century Austrian male artists